Gwinn Mountain is a summit in West Virginia, in the United States.

The summit has the name of Andrew Gwinn, an early settler.

References

Mountains of Summers County, West Virginia
Mountains of West Virginia